Nick FitzGibbon (born April 25, 1987 in Puslinch, Ontario) is a Canadian football running back who is currently a free agent. He most recently played for the Winnipeg Blue Bombers of the Canadian Football League. He was signed as an undrafted free agent by the Winnipeg Blue Bombers on September 27, 2011. He played CIS Football with the Guelph Gryphons.

References

1987 births
Living people
Players of Canadian football from Ontario
Canadian football running backs
Guelph Gryphons football players
People from Wellington County, Ontario
Winnipeg Blue Bombers players